National Route 438 is a national highway of Japan connecting Tokushima, Tokushima and Sakaide, Kagawa in Japan, with a total length of 163 km (101.28 mi).

References

National highways in Japan
Roads in Kagawa Prefecture
Roads in Tokushima Prefecture